Keith may refer to:

People and fictional characters
 Keith (given name), includes a list of people and fictional characters
 Keith (surname)
 Keith (singer), American singer James Keefer (born 1949)
 Keith (gamer), American professional League of Legends player
 Baron Keith, a line of Scottish barons in the late 18th century
 Clan Keith, a Scottish clan associated with lands in northeastern and northwestern Scotland

Places

Australia
 Keith, South Australia, a town and locality

Scotland
 Keith, Moray, a town
 Keith railway station
 Keith Marischal, East Lothian

United States
 Keith, Georgia, an unincorporated community
 Keith, Ohio, an unincorporated community
 Keith, West Virginia, an unincorporated community
 Keith, Wisconsin, a ghost town
 Keith County, Nebraska

Other uses
 Keith F.C., a football team based in Keith, Scotland
 , a ship of the British Royal Navy
 Hurricane Keith, a 2000 hurricane that caused extensive damage in Central America
 Keith (film), a 2008 independent film directed by Todd Kessler
 Keith (album), a 2019 studio album by Kool Keith
 "Keith" (song), a 2019 single by Kaylee Bell

See also
 Keith Inch, easternmost point of mainland Scotland
 Keith number, an integer that appears as a term in a linear recurrence relation with initial terms based on its own digits
 Kieth, a list of people with the given name or surname
 Dalkeith, Midlothian, a town in Scotland